The results of the Third Periodical Review of the Boundary Commission for Scotland were implemented for the 1983 general election of the House of Commons of the Parliament of the United Kingdom (Westminster).

The review defined 30 burgh constituencies (BCs) and 42 county constituencies (CCs), with each electing one Member of Parliament (MP) by the first past the post system of election. Therefore, Scotland had 72 parliamentary seats.

In 1975, Scottish counties had been abolished under the Local Government (Scotland) Act 1973, and the Third Periodical Review took account of new local government boundaries, which defined two-tier regions and districts and unitary islands council areas. No new constituency straddled a regional boundary, and each islands council area was entirely within one constituency.

The boundary commission was required to designate each new constituency as either burgh or county but had no predetermined basis on which to do so. The commission took the view that each constituency with more than a token rural electorate would be a county constituency, and others, predominantly urban, would be burgh constituencies.

1983 boundaries were used also in the general elections of 1987 and 1992.

The results of the Fourth Periodical Review were implemented for the 1997 general election

Boundaries

Regions, except Strathclyde

Strathclyde 

The districts of Strathclyde can be grouped as follows.

Islands council areas

See also 

 List of UK Parliamentary constituencies (1983-1997)

Notes and references 

 1983
1983 establishments in Scotland
1983 in British politics
1997 disestablishments in Scotland
Constituencies of the Parliament of the United Kingdom established in 1983
Constituencies of the Parliament of the United Kingdom disestablished in 1997